FC Uzda is a Belarusian football club based in Uzda, Minsk Oblast.

History
The team was founded in the 2000s as amateur club FC Uzda. They were playing in Minsk Oblast league until 2013. In 2014, the club took the name Belita-Viteks Uzda (after their main sponsor) and joined the Belarusian Second League. In the middle of the 2015 season, the name was reverted to FC Uzda, and at the end of that season, the team was promoted to the Belarusian First League.

Current squad
As of September 2022

References

Association football clubs established in 2014
Football clubs in Belarus
2014 establishments in Belarus